Desery Finies is a South African politician from the Northern Cape who has been the province's MEC for Sport, Arts and Culture since 28 June 2020. She was sworn in as a member of the provincial legislature on 12 June. Finies is a member of the African National Congress.

Political career
On 12 June 2020, Finies was sworn in as a Member of the Northern Cape Provincial Legislature.

Premier Zamani Saul, in a cabinet reshuffle on 26 June, appointed her to lead the Department of Sport, Arts and Culture. Democratic Alliance provincial leader Andrew Louw said in a statement that she "lacked experience" as a newcomer while African National Congress provincial secretary Deshi Ngxanya welcomed her appointment. Finies was formally sworn in on 28 June.

References

External links

Living people
Year of birth missing (living people)
Coloured South African people
People from the Northern Cape
African National Congress politicians
21st-century South African politicians
Members of the Northern Cape Provincial Legislature
Women members of provincial legislatures of South Africa